Conroe may refer to:
 Conroe, Texas
 Conroe (microprocessor), the code name for the first desktop processor to be based on the Core microarchitecture, sold as Intel Core 2 Duo, Xeon, Pentium Dual-Core and Celeron.